Aukštadvaris Regional Park, established in 1992, covers 17,240 hectares in southeastern Lithuania near the town of Aukštadvaris.

The park contains about 80 lakes, burial grounds, villages, and designated recreational areas. Among its cultural landmarks is an oak dedicated to the poet Adam Mickiewicz.

References

 . Association of Lithuanian State Parks and Reserves.
  . Official website.

Regional parks of Lithuania
Tourist attractions in Vilnius County